The Rajasthan cricket team is a cricket team which represents the Indian state of Rajasthan. The team won the Ranji Trophy in the 2010–11 and 2011-12 seasons, having finished runners-up eight times between 1960–61 and 1973-74. It is currently in the Ranji Trophy Elite group. It is run by the Rajasthan Cricket Association and is popularly known as "Team Rajasthan".

History

Rajputana
Rajputana's first recorded match came in the 1928/29 Delhi Tournament against Aligarh, with the Rajputana Cricket Association being formed shortly thereafter in 1931 at Ajmer. Rajputana's inaugural appearance in first-class cricket came in November 1933 against the touring Marylebone Cricket Club at Mayo College Ground in Ajmer, which resulted in a heavy innings defeat. The team entered the Ranji Trophy for the first time in the 1935/36 season, playing its first match in the competition against Central India, losing by a heavy margin. The team played in the following seasons Ranji Trophy, again losing to Central India, but this time by the reduced margin of just two wickets. Rajputana gained its first win in first-class cricket against Lionel Tennyson's touring eleven, with victory by two wickets in 1937. The team lost its only match against Southern Punjab in the 1938/39 Ranji Trophy, however the following season it recorded its first Ranji Trophy victory against Delhi, winning by 7 wickets. However it lost its following match against Southern Punjab by the margin of an innings and 190 runs. With the onset of World War II, cricket in India was somewhat disrupted, but first-class cricket continued to function.

Rajasthan

Best performances in Ranji Trophy

Famous players
Players from Rajasthan who have played Test cricket for India, along with year of Test debut:
Salim Durani (1960)
Hanumant Singh (1964)
Parthasarathy Sharma (1974)
Pravin Amre (1992)
Pankaj Singh (2014)

Players from Rajasthan who have played Test cricket for England, along with year of Test debut:
Kabir Ali (2003)

Players from Rajasthan who have played ODI but not Test cricket for India, along with year of ODI debut:
Gagan Khoda (1998)
Khaleel Ahmed (2018)
Deepak Chahar (2018)
Rahul Chahar (2021)
Ravi Bishnoi (2022)

Players from Rajasthan who have played ODI but not Test cricket for England, along with year of ODI debut:
Vikram Solanki (2000)

Current squad

 Players with international caps are listed in bold.

Updated as on 24 January 2023

Captains

Records
{{ For more details on this topic, see List of Rajasthan first-class cricket records, List of Rajasthan List A cricket records, List of Rajasthan Twenty20 cricket records }}

Grounds

Sawai Mansingh Stadium

Rajasthan play the majority of their home matches at the Sawai Mansingh Stadium.

The ends are called the City End and the Pavilion End.

Other grounds

Notes

References

Further reading

Playfair Cricket Annual – various editions
Wisden Cricketers' Almanack – various editions

External links

CricketArchive – Lists of numerous Rajasthan records and scorecards

Indian first-class cricket teams
Cricket in Rajasthan
1928 establishments in India
Cricket clubs established in 1928